Loudob Union is a union of Dacope Upazila in Khulna District of Bangladesh.

Educational institutions
 Government L.B.K Women's College
 Buridabar Model Secondary School
 Loudob Badamtala Secondary School
 Loudob M, N Government Primary School
 Khutakhali Government Primary School
 Kalikabati Government Primary School
 B, K, (Barabank) Government Primary School
 Khutakhali Natun Bazar Government Primary School
 DNS Primary School

References

Unions of Dacope Upazila
Populated places in Khulna Division
Populated places in Khulna District